Bathing Boys is a painting by the artist Jānis Valters (later Johann Walter-Kurau) from 1900.

Description
The painting is oil on canvas, with dimensions .

The painting belongs to the Latvian National Museum of Art in Riga.

Analysis
The image depicts three boys bathing at a beach in warm sunshine. Valters painted several pictures of similar design in the period 1900–1926.

References

1900 paintings
Latvian paintings